The 2017–18 Ekstraliga season was the 43rd edition of the competition since its establishment. The Ekstraliga Kobiet is the top level women's football league of Poland.

Medyk Konin were the defending champions, having won their fourth title in the previous season. Sportowa Czwórka Radom were promoted from the southern group of the I liga having won the 2016–17 campaign. Unifreeze Górzno were promoted from the northern group after finishing second behind Medyk II Konin, a reserve team which cannot be promoted to the top tier.

The campaign began on 5 August 2017. The winter break started after the 14th matchday (18 November). The first match of the spring was held on March 10. The campaign was concluded on 27 May 2018.

During the regular season, each team played 22 matches. After the 22nd round, based on their performance in the regular season, the clubs were split into two groups – the championship group (places 1–6) and the relegation group (places 7–12). Afterwards, each team played 5 more matches bringing the total to 27. The points scored during both stages were added up. At the end of the season, the bottom two clubs were demoted to the I liga.

League tables

Regular season

Final tables

Championship group

Relegation group

Top goalscorers

References

2017–18 domestic women's association football leagues
2017–18 in Polish football